Conchiophora is a genus of moths of the family Yponomeutidae.

Species 
 Conchiophora spinosella - Chrétien, 1916 

Yponomeutidae